Miss Germany is a national beauty pageant in Germany. The contest was held for the first time in 1927.

History 
In the past there were several organisations which claimed the title: In the 1920s already, German jurisdiction decided that the title Miss Germany could not be patented or registered, thus everybody was allowed to run a contest and name the winner Miss Germany. A similar decision followed in 1982. This resulted in having two titleholders in some years (as in 1928, 1931, 1953 and 1982), elected by different associations.

In 1953, the new organiser and main sponsor of the pageant, the Opal stocking industries, acquired the international franchises for Miss Europe, Miss World, and Miss Universe and built up a kind of monopoly: Other promoters could not delegate their winners to international competitions, thus such rival contests became unattractive. The election of Heidi Krüger by the daily newspaper Hamburger Morgenpost remained an exception for many years.

During the National Socialist era there were no beauty contests. The Nazi government prohibited them as "Jewish-Bolshevik decadence", and instead of them publicised the election of (local) Harvest, Bloom, and Wine Queens. The government forbade Charlotte Hartmann from taking part in the Miss Europe contest in Paris, France. She had been elected Miss Germany a few days before the beginning of the Nazi rule, and secretly took part in the pageant, nevertheless. However, the Saar Territory which was governed by the League of Nations chose a Miss, who was allowed to travel to international competitions.

In the GDR, beauty pageants were also forbidden as "degradation and exploitation of the woman by capitalism". Nevertheless, in the Eastern part of Berlin some contests were held, camouflaged as culture evenings, in the second half of the 1980s. The winners received a cake and a bouquet as a prize. In 1990, the MGC (see above) held the only official election for Miss DDR. The winner, Leticia Koffke, became the first all-German Miss Germany a few months later following reunification.

In some years, no national contests were held: the German delegates for international pageants were handpicked from the regional winners, without a final, as happened from 1972 to 1978. In 1971, the term of Irene Neumann was even extended for another year.

After the bankruptcy of the Opal company, a period of decline followed. There were no financially strong sponsors. Members of the Revolution of 1968 and feminists mobilized against the "meat-inspects". Public interest diminished. Influential organisers became not active before the end of the 1970s. The international franchises held by Opal became vacant. In 1979, Miss Germany was elected live in the German television for the first time. It was not until 1982 that the first rival contest was held again after a long interval.

Since 1985, at least two organisations run rival pageants: 
 The MGC (Miss Germany Corporation, Oldenburg) of Horst Klemmer, compère in preliminaries and finals of the 1960s, together with his son Ralf, send their winners to the Miss World and Queen of the World pageants. After an unsuccessful lawsuit of event-manager Erich Reindl in 1982, neither MGC nor another promoter can claim protection of the title. Not before 1999, MGC succeed in having registered Miss Germany  as a trade mark at the  Office for Harmonization in the Internal Market in Alicante (Spain), and secure the exclusive rights. From 2000 on, other organisers have to pick up other titles – not only for the pageants, but also for their companies‘ names. In addition to Miss Germany, MGC temporarily held also Miss World Germany, German Miss World, Queen of Germany, and Beauty Queen of Germany. Moreover, there are contests for Misses Germany and Mister Germany and Miss Germany 50 plus. In 2010, it acquired the Miss Earth license -where the Miss Germany winner will take part.
 The Miss Germany Company holds beauty pageants from 1985 to 1991: Miss Europe 1991 – Susanne Petry – came there. Not much is known about this company, besides the names of their winners. The company possibly is a predecessor of MGA.
 In 1991, the MGA (Miss Germany Association, Bergheim near Cologne) of Detlef Tursies run a Miss Germany pageant for the first time. The winners participate in Miss Universe, Miss International, Miss Europe, and Miss Intercontinental. In 1999, MGA transforms into MGO (Miss Germany Organisation). From 2000, they award the title Miss Deutschland, and change their name again: MGO - Komitee Miss Deutschland. Furthermore, they hold the international franchises as mentioned above.
 A short time before the title gains exclusivity, the situation becomes most unclear: In 1999, a third Miss Germany appears – Yvonne Wölke from Berlin. In autumn of 1999, two other organisations chose their titleholders for the year 2000 – Model of Germany Productions in Mainz-Kastel (= Miss Germany No. 4), and the MGF (Miss Germany Foundation, Barby) in Magdeburg, who awards the title Miss Millennium Deutschland (from 2001, Princess of Germany).

Titleholders

1927–1933

Notes: Daisy d’Ora was a pseudonym. The real name of the 1931 winner was Daisy, Baronesse von Freyberg. – In 1935, Elisabeth Pitz from Saarbrücken participated in the Miss Europe Pageant in Paris as last German delegate before World War II. But she was not Miss Germany.

1949–1984

Note: (1) In 1979, the Miss Germany election was broadcast live on German TV for the first time.

From 1985 : MGC - Miss Germany Corporation GmbH (Oldenburg)

1985–1991 : Miss Germany Company
Miss Germany Company winner was sending to Miss Universe.

1991–1999 : MGA - Miss Germany Association GmbH (Bergheim near Cologne)
Miss Germany Association GmbH winner was sending to Miss Universe.

1999–2000 : Other organizers

Notes: Yvonne Wölke became Miss Berlin and participated in Miss Deutschland in 2002. – The pageant and the title of Model of Germany Productions later had to be renamed Model of Germany.

2020 : Miss Germany Organisation (Miss Germany Earth)

Miss Deutschland

Miss Deutschland from 2000 : MGO/KMD - Komitee Miss Deutschland (Bergheim near Cologne)
From the following competitions, certainly, only Miss Deutschland is of importance. In the inland it does not have the same prestige as Miss Germany, but compensates this, as the election always takes place (and is announced in the media) some weeks before. One can estimate the international presence of the organization by the four assigned titles for 2006. For the other contests there are no complete data available. Also it is not always known whether they still exist. They are only shown here in order to obtain an impression how unclear the situation still is, although there is only one  Miss Germany since 2000. Since 2009 German representative to Miss Universe has selected from Miss Universe Germany Organization.

Miss Universe Deutschland

Model of Germany from 2000 : Model of Germany Productions (Stuttgart)

Note: The first pageant was held in the end of 1999 under the title of Miss Germany, but later had to be renamed.

Miss World Germany

1992–1999 : Miss World Germany : MGC

2000–2001 : German Miss World: MGC

2008–2009 : Miss World Deutschland

Beauty Queen of Germany: MGC

Beauty-Queen of Germany: BQOG-Management

Queen of Germany: MGC

Miss Germany 50 plus: From 2012 by MGC - Miss Germany Corporation GmbH

Queen of Germany: QGE - Queen of Germany Entertainment (Neuhardenberg, near Frankfurt/Oder)

Miss Millennium Deutschland: MGF - Miss Germany Foundation (Barby, Sachsen-Anhalt)

Princess of Germany: Princess Entertainment & Media Group (Barby, Sachsen-Anhalt)

Princess Entertainment is successor of MGF (renamed because the title Miss Germany must not be used any longer). – The pageants concentrate on the new (eastern) lands of the Federal Republic. Note: Mirjana Bogojevic had been elected also as Miss Germany of MGC in 2001.

Top Model of Germany: MGA/MGO Komitee Miss Deutschland (Bergheim near Cologne)

Top Model of Germany: Yet-Set Corporation (Cologne)

This pageant was promoted by MGA and MGO from 1993 to 2000. In 2001, Yet-Set Corporation in Cologne claims title protection (Titelschutz) according to German law (§ 5 Abs. 3 MarkenG).

Model of the World Germany

Miss Millennium Deutschland: MGF - Miss Germany Foundation (Barby, Sachsen-Anhalt)

Miss Allemagne: Yet-Set Corporation (Cologne)

For this pageant Yet-Set Corporation in Cologne also claims title protection in 2001. For winners' names there are contradictory information: In 2001, both Jennifer Dietrich and Eileen Bali are named. In 2003, the pageant happened in Kiel (winner unknown). It seems to have been the last edition.

Miss pageants in the GDR 
Miss DDR and predecessors (1986-1988 private events, 1990 MGC)

Note: Leticia Koffke later became Miss Germany for united Germany.

Titles at major international competitions

Miss World
 1956 : Petra Schürmann (ranked only third in Miss Germany pageant, but was delegated to Miss World because of her better knowledge of English)
 1980 : Gabriella Brum (resigned the day after her election as Miss World)

Miss Universe
 1961 : Marlene Schmidt

Miss International
 1965 : Ingrid Finger
 1989 : Iris Klein

Miss Europe
 1954 : Christel Schaack (disqualified for being a widow)
 1956 : Margit Nünke
 1961 : Ingrun Helgard Moeckel
 1965 : Juliane Herm
 1972 : Monika Sarp
 1991 : Susanne Petry (later disqualified)
 2005 : Shermine Shahrivar (is not Miss Germany but Miss Deutschland)

See also 
 Miss Austria
 Miss Switzerland

References

 Veit Didczuneit, Dirk Külow:  Miss Germany. Die deutsche Schönheitskönigin. S & L MedienContor, Hamburg, 1998;  (German)
 Former Website of MGA - Miss Germany Association: http://www. missgermany. cmsonline. de (German)

External links

 Miss Globe Germany Official Website
 Official Website MGC (German)
 Official Website KMD (German)
 Official Website QGE (German)
 Official Website Model of Germany (German)
 
 Miss Berlin Wahl 2007 with Pioneer of beauty pageants Playboy Rolf Eden

Beauty pageants in Germany
German awards
Germany